In to the Mix III is a various artists compilation album released in October 19, 1999 by Hypnotic Records.

Track listing

Personnel
Adapted from the In to the Mix III liner notes.

 Eunah Lee – cover art, illustrations, design

Release history

References

External links 
 In to the Mix III at Discogs (list of releases)

1997 compilation albums
Hypnotic Records compilation albums